The women's doubles of the 2006 ECM Prague Open tournament was played on clay in Prague, Czech Republic.

Émilie Loit and Nicole Pratt were the defending champions, but none competed this year, with Loit choosing to focus on the singles tournament.

Marion Bartoli and Shahar Pe'er won the title by defeating Ashley Harkleroad and Bethanie Mattek 6–4, 6–4 in the final.

Seeds

Draw

Draw

External links
 Main Draw

2006 Women's Doubles
2006 in Czech women's sport